Nea Chalkidona (meaning New Chalcedon) is a suburb of Athens, Greece. Since the 2011 local government reform it is part of the municipality Filadelfeia-Chalkidona, of which it is a municipal unit.

Nea Chalkidona is an inner suburb of Athens, located 5 km north of the city centre. Its built-up area is continuous with that of municipalities of Athens and the surrounding northern suburbs Agioi Anargyroi and Nea Filadelfeia. At 0.80 km² it is the smallest municipal unit in the Athens metropolitan area. Motorway 1 (Athens - Thessaloniki) and Greek National Road 1 pass through Nea Chalkidona. The nearest metro station is Ano Patisia metro station.

Historical population

See also
List of municipalities of Attica

References

External links
Official website 

Populated places in Central Athens (regional unit)